Ko Thap ("Thap Island", sometimes spelled Tub) is an island in Krabi Province, Thailand. This island is a member of the Poda Archipelago, which is composed of Poda Island, Tub Island, Mor Island and Kai Island. Locals refer to Tab Island as Koh Tub.

Activities 
Aside from having beaches, a coral reef surrounds the area, which has attracted snorkeling and other outdoor activities.

Separated Sea  
At low tide, the three islands link together, forming a "Tha-le Waek" (Separated sea). Tourists can walk across the beach to all of the islands.

References

Islands of the Strait of Malacca
Geography of Krabi province